is a former Japanese football player. He last played for Matsumoto Yamaga FC.

Club statistics
Updated to 2 February 2018.

References

External links
Profile at Matsumoto Yamaga

1992 births
Living people
Takushoku University alumni
Association football people from Nagasaki Prefecture
Japanese footballers
J1 League players
J2 League players
Matsumoto Yamaga FC players
Association football midfielders